Robert John  (born 1946) is an American singer-songwriter.

Robert John may also refer to:

Robert John (photographer) (born 1961), American music photographer
Robert Franklin John (1851–1905), farmer and politician in British Columbia, Canada

See also
Robert St. John (1902–2003), American author, broadcaster, and journalist